WIDL (92.1 FM, "I92") is a radio station broadcasting a classic rock format. Licensed to Cass City, Michigan, it first began broadcasting at 104.9 MHz licensed to Caro, Michigan, and still maintains offices and studios in Caro with sister station WKYO. Overall, the station specializes in providing locally focused content such as regional news, weather and sports programming. It is owned by Edwards Communications, which also owns The Tuscola County Advertiser newspaper.

In late 2006, WIDL flipped formats from a variety hits format to a locally programmed Hot AC format which positions itself as "The Best Mix of The 80's 90's and Now". Past formats have included easy listening, adult contemporary, classic rock and oldies.

As of August 2016, the Monday to Friday lineup includes Morning Traffic Jam with Bob Hughes, Michelle Mitchell (The Mitch) from 1pm until 6pm, and Scott Bolsby from 6pm until midnight. Midnight to 6am, and weekends are limited commercial interrupted music.

Fridays during the football and basketball seasons feature a live Game of the Week, covering local high school teams in the Thumb area of Michigan.

Saturday programming includes a local sport's talk show; Let's Talk Sports 10 to 11am, The Arena Parking Lot; an entire classic rock live concert album that starts at 8pm; and The Hairball John and Friends Radio Show at 10pm.

On Sunday mornings, the station runs The Acoustic Storm from 9am until noon.

On February 3, 2017, WIDL changed their format from hot adult contemporary to classic rock, branded as "I92".

References

External links

WIDL history, Michiguide.com

IDL
Classic rock radio stations in the United States
Radio stations established in 1974
1982 establishments in Michigan